CISL Public Function (FP) is a trade union representing public sector workers in Italy.

The union was established in 1999, when the Italian Federation of Territorial Services, representing healthcare workers, merged with the Federation of Public Employees.  Like both its predecessors, it affiliated to the Italian Confederation of Trade Unions (CISL).  By 2017, it had 244,705 members, making it the second-largest sectoral trade union affiliated to the CISL.  Since 2017, the union has been led by Maurizio Petriccioli.

External links

References

Public sector trade unions
Trade unions established in 1999
Trade unions in Italy